Dove Lake is a reservoir in Montgomery County, Pennsylvania. It was created by damming Mill Creek.

Dove Lake was the setting of the 1885 painting The Swimming Hole by Thomas Eakins.

Dove Lake is on a privately owned property in Bryn Mawr and Gladwyne.

References 

Lower Merion Township, Pennsylvania
Reservoirs in Pennsylvania
Protected areas of Montgomery County, Pennsylvania
Bodies of water of Montgomery County, Pennsylvania